is a Japanese professional rock climber, sport climber and boulderer.

She participates in both bouldering and lead climbing competitions. She is known for winning the IFSC Climbing World Cup in Bouldering four times. In her home country, she won Bouldering Japan Cup nine times consecutively from 2005 to 2014, which no other Japanese athlete has been able to match.

She retired from competition climbing after competing and winning a bronze medal in the 2020 Summer Olympics.

Biography 
Noguchi grew up on a cattle farm in the Ibaraki Prefecture. From a young age she would climb on buildings, trees and sometimes even on the cows. In 2000, when she was 11 years old, she tried a real climbing wall for the first time, during a holiday trip to Guam. Back at home she immediately joined a local climbing gym. Her father later built her a climbing wall in an old cattle barn on the farm.

In 2007, she started competing in the Bouldering World Cups, reaching the podium three times. In 2009, she won the World Cup in bouldering, over the previous year's champion Anna Stöhr. Noguchi repeated as champion in 2010, 2014 and 2015. In the 2011, 2012 and 2013 bouldering events at the World Cup she placed second. She has also won the combined climbling title at the World Cup three times.

Noguchi was also awarded the La Sportiva Competition Award in 2010, "for her victories and the positive spirit she exudes during competitions".

In 2019 Akiyo Noguchi won a silver medal in the combined competition at the climbing World Championship which qualified her for the 2020 Summer Olympics. Noguchi had contemplated retirement from competition climbing as early as 2016, but when it was announced that climbing would become an Olympic sport in 2020 for the first time she decided to try and qualify for Olympics in her home country. Noguchi attended her final IFSC Climbing World Cup in Innsbruck in June 2021, finishing a career of 169 World Cups and World Championships and 75 podium places. On July 13, 2021, she published an autobiography.

She finished her climbing career with a bronze medal at the 2020 Summer Olympics.

On December 25, 2021, Noguchi and fellow Japanese sport climber Tomoa Narasaki announced their marriage on their respective social media pages.

Rankings

World Cup

World Championships

World Cup podiums

Lead

Bouldering

Rock climbing

Redpointed routes 
:
 Mind Control - Oliana (SPN) - December 10, 2013
:
 Liquid Finger - Joyama (JPN) - December 12, 2008

Boulder problems 
:
 Aguni - Mizugaki (JPN) - November 2014.
 A Maze of Death - Bishop (CAL) - 2016.
 Euro Trash - Little Cottonwood Canyon (UT) - May 2022.

:
 Monsterman SD - Jyougasaki (JPN) - February 2010.
 Evilution Direct - Bishop (CAL) - 2016.

See also 
 Akiyo Noguchi in the Climbing World Cup
 IFSC Climbing World Cup
 IFSC Climbing World Championships
 IFSC Climbing Asian Championships

References

External links 

 
 
 
 
 

1989 births
Living people
Japanese rock climbers
Asian Games medalists in sport climbing
Sport climbers at the 2018 Asian Games
Asian Games gold medalists for Japan
Medalists at the 2018 Asian Games
Competitors at the 2009 World Games
Competitors at the 2017 World Games
Sport climbers at the 2020 Summer Olympics
Olympic sport climbers of Japan
Olympic bronze medalists for Japan
Olympic medalists in sport climbing
Medalists at the 2020 Summer Olympics
IFSC Climbing World Championships medalists
IFSC Climbing World Cup overall medalists
Boulder climbers